The High Island Reservoir, located in the far south eastern part of the Sai Kung Peninsula, was opened in 1978 helping to alleviate water shortage problems in Hong Kong. Its water capacity is approximately 273 million cubic metres. The area it occupies was originally the Kwun Mun Channel, which separated High Island from the Sai Kung Peninsula.

History
Its history starts as a result of the water shutdown by mainland China during the Hong Kong 1967 riots, the government responded with the High Island Reservoir. It was expected to be the same size as Plover Cove Reservoir.

There is a memorial next to the East Dam dedicated to five workers who lost their lives during the project's construction.

Design
The reservoir was designed by Binnie & Partners as a part of the High Island Water Scheme which included pipeworks and other supporting infrastructure as well as the reservoir itself. The reservoir was created by constructing two main dams. One was built at the west of High Island connecting it with the Sai Kung Peninsula at Yuen Ng Fan. The other was built in the southeast of High Island, connecting it with the Sai Kung Peninsula near Po Pin Chau, a stack island. Three smaller dams were also constructed in valleys around the reservoir. Aqueducts totalling 5 miles in length were also constructed to transfer water from streams around Sai Kung Peninsula to the reservoir. Construction spanned 10 years from 1969 to 1979. Two roads were created as part of the scheme, crossing over the dams. This enabled visitors to access a very remote and unspoilt area for recreation. Many of the techniques and technology used, like grouting, was cutting edge at the time.

See also
 Reservoirs of Hong Kong
 Lan Nai Wan
 Man Yee Wan New Village
 High Island Detention Centre
 Sai Kung East Country Park
 Hong Kong National Geopark

References

External links

 High Island Reservoir
 High Island: Internationally rare acidic polygonal volcanic rock columns*

Reservoirs in Hong Kong
Sai Kung Peninsula
Hong Kong UNESCO Global Geopark